This is a list of women artists who were born in China or whose artworks are closely associated with that country.

B
Bingyi (born 1975), painter
Bu Hua (born 1973), digital artist

C
Chai Jingyi (17th-century), poet, painter
Chevalier li (born 1961), painter, installation, Chinese born French artist
Cai Jin (born 1965), painter
Chang Ch'ung-ho or Zhang Chonghe (1914–2015), Chinese-American poet, painter, calligrapher
Cao Fei (born 1978), multimedia artist
Cao Yu (artist) (born 1988), visual artist
Chen Ke (born 1978), painter
Chen Peiqiu (born 1922), best-selling woman painter alive
Chen Shu (1660–1736), Qing dynasty painter
Irene Chou (1924–2011), calligrapher and painter 
Chow Chung-cheng (1908–1996), finger painter, writer
Chen, Movana (born 1975), paper knitting artist

F
Fu Daokun (fl. 1626), painter

G
A Ge (born 1948), print-maker
Guan Daogao (1262–1319?), calligrapher, poet and painter
Guan Daosheng (1262–1319), "the most famous female painter in Chinese history."
Guan Zilan or Violet Kwan (1903–1986), avant-garde painter

H
Han Yajuan (born 1980), contemporary artist
He Xiangning (1878–1972), feminist, politician, painter, poet
He Zhihong (born 1970), book illustrator

J
Aowen Jin (active since 2010), Chinese-born British artist

K
Kan Xuan (born 1972), visual artist

L
Jaffa Lam (born 1973), contemporary artist
Li Chevalier (born 1961) painting; installation Chinese born French artist (诗蓝 in Chinese)
Li Shuang (born 1957), contemporary artist
Liao Jingwen (1923–2015), calligrapher and curator of the Xu Beihong Memorial Museum
Beili Liu (born 1974), contemporary visual artist, installation and performance
Luo Wei (artist) (born 1989), contemporary artist
Liu Rushi (born Ming dynasty), courtesan, poet, female leader, artist

N
Nie Ou (born 1948), painter

M
Ma Shouzhen (c.1548–1604), courtesan, painter, poet, composer

P
Peng Wei (born 1974), contemporary artist

Q
Qiu Zhu (active in Ming dynasty), painter

S
Shen Shou (1874–1921), embroiderer
Sun Duoci (1912–1975), painter

T 
 Fan Tchunpi (1898–1986), painter and ceramicist

W
Wang Henei (1912–2000), sculptor
Wen Shu (1595–1634), painter
Evan Siu Ping Wu (active since 2012), painter
Yuhua Shouzhi Wang (born 1966), painter

X
Xiao Lu (born 1962), installation and video artist
Xin Fengxia (1927–1998), pingju actress, painter, writer
XinMo Li (born 1976), contemporary artist
Xue Susu (c.1564–1650), courtesan, painter, poet

Y 
 Yijun Liao (born 1979)
 Yin Xiuzhen (born 1963), sculptor and installation artist
 Ying Miao (born 1985), Internet artist
 Tseng Yu-ho (1924–2017)

Z
Zhang Huaicun (born 1972) painter, writer and poet
Zimei (active since 1999), multidisciplinary artist, musician

See also 
 List of Chinese artists

-
Chinese women artists, List of
Artists
Artists